Ciumești is a commune located in Satu Mare County, Romania.

Composition 
The commune is composed of three villages that were separated from Sanislău in 2004:

History

Bronze and Iron Age 

Human settlements dating from the Bronze Age have been found in the area, and during the 1960s, 35 Celtic graves were discovered, including the Helmet of Ciumești.

Modern times 
Before the Treaty of Trianon in 1920, the villages belonged to Szatmár County of the Kingdom of Hungary. Until 2004, they belonged to Sanislău Commune, when they were split off to form Ciumești Commune.

References

Communes in Satu Mare County